El Cerrito High School is a four-year public high school in the West Contra Costa Unified School District. It is located on Ashbury Avenue in El Cerrito, California, United States and serves students from El Cerrito, a portion of eastern Richmond (east of Interstate 80 and south of San Pablo Dam Road) and the unincorporated communities of East Richmond Heights and Kensington.

As of the 2014-15 school year, the school had an enrollment of 1,364 students and 55.2 classroom teachers (on an FTE basis), for a student–teacher ratio of 24.7:1. There were 572 students (41.9% of enrollment) eligible for free lunch and 119 (8.7% of students) eligible for reduced-cost lunch.

Overview
The original main school building was built in the late 1930s as a WPA project. The school opened to students on January 6, 1941.

Student population quickly outgrew the facilities, and the campus became a collection of small, outlying buildings. As concern grew over the building's safety and structural stability, plans were made for more integrated buildings and, in the summer of 2005, demolition of the old campus began. By 2007, the campus had been demolished, and the terrain was leveled in preparation for reconstruction. During the reconstruction, all classes were held in temporary buildings located south of the campus on the former baseball field. The new campus opened on January 5, 2009.

El Cerrito's student body is 35.6% African-American, 23.7% Hispanic, 17.2% Asian, 16.7% Caucasian, and 2.5% Filipino. Many of these students are actually mixed race, making El Cerrito a very diverse high school. Half of students come from families with a low enough income to qualify for free or reduced price lunches under the National School Lunch Act. Many students come from the neighboring city of Richmond, which is also served by the West Contra Costa Unified School District.

Art programs

Before the bankruptcy of the Richmond Unified School District, El Cerrito High School was a regional magnet for the arts. Recovery from the bankruptcy coincided with less available funds, slowing recovery, but the rebuilt school has a theater that has been used by professional organizations such as West Edge Opera.

Bands

The Gaucho Band may have become the first high-school band to be nationally televised when they stood in for Ohio State University Marching Band at their game against Berkeley at Memorial Stadium on October 3, 1953. The Gauchos then adapted and adopted Ohio's fight song, "Across the Field," as "Down the Field."

Notable attendees

Athletics
Dwain Anderson, MLB infielder, Oakland Athletics 1971-1972, St. Louis Cardinals 1972-1973, San Diego Padres 1973, Cleveland Indians 1974
Aaron Banks, NFL offensive guard, San Francisco 49ers 2021-Present
Jerry Bell, NFL tight end, Tampa Bay Buccaneers 1982-1987
Ernie Broglio, MLB pitcher, St. Louis Cardinals 1959-1964, Chicago Cubs 1964-66
Mike Burns, NFL player
Les Cain, MLB pitcher, Detroit Tigers 1968, 1970–1972
John Flavin, MLB pitcher, Chicago Cubs 1964
Drew Gooden, NBA power forward/center, Washington Wizards 2002-2016
Cornell Green, NFL defensive back, Dallas Cowboys 1962-1974
Pumpsie Green, MLB infielder, Boston Red Sox 1959-1962, New York Mets 1963
Mario Hollands, MLB pitcher, Philadelphia Phillies 2014-2017
Roddy Lee, Olympic athlete
Kamil Loud, NFL wide receiver/kick returner, Buffalo Bills 1998-99
Jamir Miller, NFL linebacker, Arizona Cardinals 1994-98, Cleveland Browns 1999-2002
Bob Newman, football player
Chris Roberson, MLB outfielder, Philadelphia Phillies 2006-07
Terrell Roberts, NFL player
Harvey Salem, NFL offensive tackle 1983-1992
Todd Spencer, NFL running back, Pittsburgh Steelers 1984-1985, San Diego Chargers 1987
John Thomas, NFL player 1958-1967
Lamont Thompson, NFL defensive safety 2002-2007

Entertainment
Paul Baloff, former vocalist of Exodus
Stephen Bradley, touring member of the band No Doubt; music producer
Doug Clifford, member of the band Creedence Clearwater Revival
Lawrence Coates, novelist
Stu Cook, member of the band Creedence Clearwater Revival
James Farr, journalist, writer, and media personality
John Fogerty, member of the band Creedence Clearwater Revival
Cynthia Gouw, TV news host, model and actress; class of 1981
Michael Jeffries, singer, Tower of Power
Phil Lesh, musician, of the Grateful Dead
Larry Lynch, drummer best known for his work with The Greg Kihn Band
Maria Remenyi, former Miss USA
Adam Sessler, host of G4's X-Play
Mark Whitaker, former band manager of Exodus; produced albums for Exodus and Metallica
Steve Wright, bassist best known for his work with The Greg Kihn Band

Business
Martin Eberhard, founder of Tesla Motors
Byron Lars, fashion designer

Academia
Amy Chua, law professor at Yale Law School, author of Battle Hymn of the Tiger Mother
Lawrence Coates, professor at Bowling Green State University

References

High schools in Contra Costa County, California
Educational institutions established in 1941
Public high schools in California
El Cerrito, California
1941 establishments in California